Micromagnetics is a field of physics dealing with the prediction of magnetic behaviors at sub-micrometer length scales. The length scales considered are large enough for the atomic structure of the material to be ignored (the continuum approximation), yet small enough to resolve magnetic structures such as domain walls or vortices.

Micromagnetics can deal with static equilibria, by minimizing the magnetic energy, and with dynamic behavior, by solving the time-dependent dynamical equation.

History
Micromagnetics as a field (i.e., that deals specifically with the behaviour of ferromagnetic materials at sub-micrometer length scales) was introduced in 1963 when William Fuller Brown Jr. published a paper on antiparallel domain wall structures. Until comparatively recently computational micromagnetics has been prohibitively expensive in terms of computational power, but smaller problems are now solvable on a modern desktop PC.

Static micromagnetics 
The purpose of static micromagnetics is to solve for the spatial distribution of the magnetization M at equilibrium. In most cases, as the temperature is much lower than the Curie temperature of the material considered, the modulus |M| of the magnetization is assumed to be everywhere equal to the saturation magnetization Ms. The problem then consists in finding the spatial orientation of the magnetization, which is given by the magnetization direction vector m = M/Ms, also called reduced magnetization.

The static equilibria are found by minimizing the magnetic energy,
,
subject to the constraint |M|=Ms or |m|=1.

The contributions to this energy are the following:

Exchange energy 
The exchange energy is a phenomenological continuum description of the quantum-mechanical exchange interaction. It is written as:

where A is the exchange constant; mx, my and mz are the components of m;
and the integral is performed over the volume of the sample.

The exchange energy tends to favor configurations where the magnetization varies only slowly across the sample. This energy is minimized when the magnetization is perfectly uniform.

Anisotropy energy 

Magnetic anisotropy arises due to a combination of crystal structure and spin-orbit interaction. It can be generally written as:

where Fanis, the anisotropy energy density, is a function of the orientation of the magnetization. Minimum-energy directions for Fanis are called easy axes.

Time-reversal symmetry ensures that Fanis is an even function of m. The simplest such function is
.
where K is called the anisotropy constant. In this approximation, called uniaxial anisotropy, the easy axis is the z direction.

The anisotropy energy favors magnetic configurations where the magnetization is everywhere aligned along an easy axis.

Zeeman energy 

The Zeeman energy is the interaction energy between the magnetization and any externally applied field. It's written as:

where Ha is the applied field and µ0 is the vacuum permeability.

The Zeeman energy favors alignment of the magnetization parallel to the applied field.

Energy of the demagnetizing field 

The demagnetizing field is the magnetic field created by the magnetic sample upon itself. The associated energy is:

where Hd is the demagnetizing field. This field depends on the magnetic configuration itself, and it can be found by solving:

where −∇·M is sometimes called magnetic charge density. The solution of these equations (c.f. magnetostatics) is:

where r is the vector going from the current integration point to the point where Hd is being calculated.

It is worth noting that the magnetic charge density can be infinite at the edges of the sample, due to M changing discontinuously from a finite value inside to zero outside of the sample. This is usually dealt with by using suitable boundary conditions on the edge of the sample.

The energy of the demagnetizing field favors magnetic configurations that minimize magnetic charges. In particular, on the edges of the sample, the magnetization tends to run parallel to the surface. In most cases it is not possible to minimize this energy term at the same time as the others. The static equilibrium then is a compromise that minimizes the total magnetic energy, although it may not minimize individually any particular term.

Magnetoelastic Energy  
The magnetoelastic energy describes the energy storage due to elastic lattice distortions. It may be neglected if magnetoelastic coupled effects are neglected.
There exists a preferred local distortion of the crystalline solid associated with the magnetization director m, . 
For a simple model, one can assume this strain to be isochoric and fully
isotropic in the lateral direction, yielding the deviatoric ansatz

where the material parameter E > 0 is the magnetostrictive
constant. Clearly, E is the strain induced by the magnetization in
the direction m. With this ansatz at hand, we consider the elastic
energy density to be a function of the elastic, stress-producing
strains . A quadratic form for the magnetoelastic energy is

where 
is the fourth-order elasticity tensor. Here the elastic response is assumed to be isotropic (based on 
the two Lamé constants λ and μ).
Taking into account the constant length of m, we obtain the invariant-based representation

This energy term contributes to magnetostriction.

Dynamic micromagnetics 
The purpose of dynamic micromagnetics is to predict the time evolution of the magnetic configuration of a sample subject to some non-steady conditions such as the application of a field pulse or an AC field. This is done by solving the Landau-Lifshitz-Gilbert equation, which is a partial differential equation describing the evolution of the magnetization in terms of the local effective field acting on it.

Effective field 
The effective field is the local field felt by the magnetization. It can be described informally as the derivative of the magnetic energy density with respect to the orientation of the magnetization, as in:

where dE/dV is the energy density. In variational terms, a change dm of the magnetization and the associated change dE of the magnetic energy are related by:

Since m is a unit vector, dm is always perpendicular to m. Then the above definition leaves unspecified the component of Heff that is parallel to m. This is usually not a problem, as this component has no effect on the magnetization dynamics.

From the expression of the different contributions to the magnetic energy, the effective field can be found to be:

Landau-Lifshitz-Gilbert equation 

This is the equation of motion of the magnetization. It describes a Larmor precession of the magnetization around the effective field, with an additional damping term arising from the coupling of the magnetic system to the environment. The equation can be written in the so-called Gilbert form (or implicit form) as:

where γ is the electron gyromagnetic ratio and α the Gilbert damping constant.

It can be shown that this is mathematically equivalent to the following Landau-Lifshitz (or explicit) form:

Applications
The interaction of micromagnetics with mechanics is also of interest in the context of industrial applications that deal with magneto-acoustic resonance such as in hypersound speakers, high frequency magnetostrictive transducers etc. 
FEM simulations taking into account the effect of magnetostriction into micromagnetics are of importance. Such simulations use models described above within a finite element framework.

Apart from conventional magnetic domains and domain-walls, the theory also treats the statics and dynamics of topological line and point configurations, e.g. magnetic vortex and antivortex states; or even 3d-Bloch points, where, for example, the magnetization leads radially into all directions from the origin, or into  topologically equivalent configurations. Thus in space, and also in time, nano- (and even pico-)scales are used.

The corresponding topological quantum numbers are thought to be used as information carriers, to apply the most recent, and already studied, propositions in information technology.

Another application that has emerged in the last decade is the application of micromagnetics towards neuronal stimulation. In this discipline, numerical methods such as finite-element analysis are used to analyze the electric/magnetic fields generated by the stimulation apparatus; then the results are validated or explored further using in-vivo or in-vitro neuronal stimulation. Several distinct set of neurons have been studied using this methodology including retinal neurons, cochlear neurons, vestibular neurons, and cortical neurons of embryonic rats.

See also
 Magnetism
 Magnetic nanoparticles

Footnotes and references

Further reading

External links
 µMAG -- Micromagnetic Modeling Activity Group.
 OOMMF -- Micromagnetic Modeling Tool.
 MuMax -- GPU-accelerated Micromagnetic Modeling Tool.

Dynamical systems
Magnetic ordering
Magnetostatics